Kansas's 18th Senate district is one of 40 districts in the Kansas Senate. It has been represented by Republican Kristen O'Shea since January 11, 2021. Previous senators include Democrat Vic Miller and Governor Laura Kelly.

Geography
District 18 is based in northern Topeka, also stretching west to Silver Lake, Rossville, St. Marys, and Wamego. It covers parts of Pottawatomie, Shawnee, and Wabaunsee Counties.

The district overlaps with Kansas's 1st and 2nd congressional districts, and with the 47th, 50th, 51st, 52nd, 53rd, 55th, 57th, 58th, and 61st districts of the Kansas House of Representatives.

Recent election results

2020

2016

2012

Federal and statewide results in District 18

References

18
Pottawatomie County, Kansas
Shawnee County, Kansas
Wabaunsee County, Kansas